Royal Air Force Bardney or RAF Bardney is a former Royal Air Force station located  north of Bardney, Lincolnshire, England and  east of the County town of Lincoln. It was built as a satellite to RAF Waddington in 1943 and the airfield closed in 1963.

History

Second World War

 Opened on 13 April 1943 as home to No. 9 Squadron.
 October 1944, No. 227 Squadron formed at Bardney before moving to RAF Balderton.
 November 1944, No. 189 Squadron formed at Bardney.
 7 July 1945, No. 9 Squadron departs and the airfield is closed.

Cold War

 1945 onwards, site is used by the British Army for vehicle storage.
 From 1959 to 1963, No. 106 Squadron operates as a Thor missile unit here.

The Bomber Command Film Flight Unit was formed here on 10 March 1945, before moving to RAF Fulbeck on 8 April 1945.

Current use

The control tower is currently being used by the Bardney Flyers Model Club, a model aircraft flying club.  The former RAF station's hangars have been turned into warehouses.

References

Citations

Bibliography

Royal Air Force stations in Lincolnshire